The Human Environment Animal Protection Party (short form: Animal Protection Party) is a political party in Germany, founded in 1993. In 2014 one candidate was elected to the European Parliament, and one candidate was elected again in 2019. As of February 2020, the party has no members in the European Parliament, no members in any of the German state parliaments, and no members of the Bundestag.

Overview 
The party aspires to turn away from the anthropocentric view of life. Its main goal is the introduction of more animal rights into the German constitution. Those include the right to live and the protection from physical and psychological damages. The Tierschutzpartei also demands prohibition of animal testing, bullfighting, hunting, the production of furs, circus animals and agricultural animal husbandry, as well as the adaptation of the people to veganism. The party supports a ban on genetic engineering and wants a reduction of car traffic and an immediate exit from nuclear energy. Economically it supports more social justice, a stamp duty and a free basic income.

In the 2014 European parliament elections, the Animal Protection Party received 1.25% of the national vote (366,303 votes in total) and returned one MEP, Stefan Eck, who sits with the EUL-NGL. In December 2014 Eck left the party and became an independent MEP in the EUL-NGL-group.

In the 2019 European parliament elections, the Animal Protection Party received 1.45% of the national vote (541,984 votes in total) and returned one MEP, Martin Buschmann. Buschmann resigned from the party in February 2020 after it was revealed that from 1992 to 1996 he was a member of and a chairman in the far-right National Democratic Party of Germany (NPD).

In the 2021 federal election the Animal Protection Party received 1,5 % of the national vote (675,353 votes in total), which is the best result in a national election since the party has been founded. 

The party holds 37 seats in municipality and county assemblies and 1 seat in the Bezirkstag Oberbayern.

See also 
 European Vegetarian Union
 List of animal advocacy parties
 Gisela Bulla

References

External links 
  
 Euro Animal 7 

Political parties in Germany
Animal advocacy parties
Political parties established in 1993
1993 establishments in Germany
Parties represented in the European Parliament
Universal basic income in Germany
Political parties supporting universal basic income